László Cseresnyés (born 30 July 1958) is a Hungarian equestrian. He competed in two events at the 1980 Summer Olympics.

References

External links
 

1958 births
Living people
Hungarian male equestrians
Olympic equestrians of Hungary
Equestrians at the 1980 Summer Olympics
Sportspeople from Veszprém County
20th-century Hungarian people